Shib may refer to:

Shib (village), a village in Iran. 
SHIB, the code for the cryptocurrency Shiba Inu coin